James Jamieson may refer to:

Sportspeople
James Jamieson (dancer) (1920–1993), Highland dancer
James Jamieson (ice hockey) (1922–1985), hockey player
Jim Jamieson (1943–2018), U.S. golfer
Jimmy Jamieson ( 1890s), Scottish footballer with Everton, Sheffield Wednesday

Others
James Jamieson (Australian doctor) (1840–1916), Scottish-born doctor, active in Australia
James Jamieson (New Zealand doctor) (1880–1963), Scottish-born doctor, active in New Zealand
James P. Jamieson (1867–1941), Missouri architect
James Edgar Jamieson (1873–1958), Ontario farmer and political figure
James Jamieson (dentist) (1875–1966), Scottish dentist and author
James D. Jamieson (born 1934), cell biologist

See also
 James Jamerson (disambiguation)
 James Jameson (disambiguation)